The 2011 Asian Wrestling Championships were held in Tashkent, Uzbekistan. The event took place from May 19 to May 22, 2011.

Medal table

Team ranking

Medal summary

Men's freestyle

Men's Greco-Roman

Women's freestyle

Participating nations 
234 competitors from 21 nations competed.

 (21)
 (5)
 (19)
 (14)
 (9)
 (21)
 (3)
 (21)
 (20)
 (14)
 (11)
 (2)
 (2)
 (17)
 (7)
 (14)
 (3)
 (2)
 (1)
 (20)
 (8)

References
Results

External links
Official website

Asia
Asian Wrestling Championships
W
W